Norman No. 1 Oil Well Site is the site of an abandoned oil well, located at the northeast corner of Mill and First Streets in Neodesha, Kansas, USA. The well, which was drilled on November 28, 1892, was the first successful well in what is now known as the Mid-Continent oil field, kicking off a major oil boom in states from Kansas to Texas and Louisiana. The well site, now a small municipal park, was designated a National Historic Landmark in 1977.

Description and history
The Norman No. 1 Oil Well Site is located in the small southeastern Kansas town of Neodesha, at the northeast corner of 1st and East Mill Streets. (It is not on the south side of Main Street, where a replica oil derrick stands.) The park has open grassy areas and a small parking area, and the original site of the oil well is marked by a plaque. The park originally housed a small visitors center, playground, restrooms, and the replica derrick, but all of these were removed due to repeated flooding.

The Neodesha area was known to Native Americans for glowing "gas springs" prior to its settlement by westward-migrating Americans. Reports of this feature eventually brought William Mills, an oil explorer to the town. One of the sites he selected for drilling was on the land of T.J. Norman, a local blacksmith. This kicked off a local boom,  which was eventually expanded to a much larger geographic area by other finds.

Norman No. 1 operated until 1919, when part of the well casing failed, and its infrastructure was dismantled. The city built a replica of the derrick and other infrastructure on the site in 1961, turning it into a small park and tourist attraction. The derrick and museum were moved to Main Street in 1989, due to repeated flooding of the site.

See also
List of National Historic Landmarks in Kansas
National Register of Historic Places listings in Wilson County, Kansas

References

Buildings and structures in Wilson County, Kansas
National Historic Landmarks in Kansas
Energy infrastructure completed in 1892
Industrial buildings and structures on the National Register of Historic Places in Kansas
Tourist attractions in Wilson County, Kansas
National Register of Historic Places in Wilson County, Kansas
Oil wells on the National Register of Historic Places